Hypostomus aspidolepis is a species of catfish in the family Loricariidae that is of disputed taxonomic identity. It is a freshwater fish native to Central America, where it occurs in the Gatún River basin in the Caribbean coastal drainage of Panama. The species reaches 40 cm (15.7 inches) in standard length and is believed to be a facultative air-breather. Although originally described as a member of Chaetostomus by Albert Günther in 1867, it has subsequently been classified within Hypostomus, the now-invalid genus Plecostomus, and Hemiancistrus. A 2015 review conducted by Jonathan W. Armbruster (of Auburn University), David C. Werneke, and Milton Tan recognized the species within Hypostomus, although sources such as FishBase, WoRMS and ITIS still consider it a member of Hemiancistrus.

References 

aspidolepis
Fish described in 1867